"My Best Days Are Ahead of Me" is a song written by Marv Green and Kent Blazy, and recorded by American Idol season 8 finalist Danny Gokey. It was released in December 2009 as the lead-off single from his debut album My Best Days, which was released on March 2, 2010, via RCA Nashville.

Content
In "My Best Days Are Ahead of Me," the narrator looks back at the mistakes he has made in his life, but realizes that his "best days are ahead of [him]."

History
Originally, Gokey's first single was slated to be "It's Only," written by Charles Kelley and Dave Haywood of Lady Antebellum. This song was withdrawn as a single in November 2009 and replaced with "My Best Days Are Ahead of Me."

Critical reception
Karlie Justus of Engine 145 gave the song a thumbs-down. Her review called it "a believable, earnest effort that’s bland and entirely forgettable," and criticized it for a lack of narrative. Matt Bjorke described the song positively in his review of the album, saying that its positive message "aligns nicely with [Gokey]." Deborah Evans Price of Billboard praised Gokey's vocal performance and called the song "the feel-good country song of 2010." Brian Mansfield of USA Today gave a positive review, saying, "With its uptempo tone of tempered optimism, My Best Days Are Ahead of Me is just the right kind of introductory single for Danny."

Music video
The music video was filmed at a warehouse in Nashville, Tennessee and directed by Wes Edwards. It contains footage of Gokey performing the song, interspersed with motivational messages that appear on the screen. Gokey told Country Weekly magazine that he was comfortable filming the video: "I felt like American Idol gave me some experience in being in front of a camera."

Commercial performance
"My Best Days Are Ahead of Me" debuted at number 55 on the Billboard Hot Country Songs charts dated for the week ending December 26, 2009. The song entered the country Top 40 at number 39 on the chart dated for the week ending February 20, 2010. The song also debuted at #82 on the Billboard Hot 100 for the week ending March 20, 2010. The song reached its peak of number 24 on the country chart in May 2010.

Charts

References

Danny Gokey songs
2009 debut singles
Songs written by Kent Blazy
Songs written by Marv Green
Music videos directed by Wes Edwards
RCA Records Nashville singles
Song recordings produced by Mark Bright (record producer)
2009 songs